Disney Enchantment is a fireworks and projection mapping show that debuted at the Magic Kingdom on September 30, 2021, as part of Walt Disney World's 50th Anniversary Celebration. Similar to its predecessor, Happily Ever After, the show features fireworks, projection mapping, lasers, and searchlights set to Disney music that extend from Cinderella Castle down to Main Street, U.S.A. The music also includes a new original song "You Are the Magic" performed by Phillip Lawrence (who also co-wrote with Davy Nathan) and Kayla Alvarez.

The original version of the show received heavy criticism from guests and fans alike due to a significant lack of the history of Walt Disney World within the show. Given the criticism of the original version, an updated version of the show debuted on August 22, 2022, with a new opening sequence featuring Walt Disney, Roy O. Disney, Mickey Mouse, and classic park attractions.

On September 11, 2022 at the D23, Disney announced that the show's predecessor, Happily Ever After, was to return in the year 2023. Disney later confirmed on January 10, 2023 that Disney Enchantment will play for the final time on April 2, 2023, two days after the end of Walt Disney World's 50th anniversary celebration with Happily Ever After taking back its place the night after.

Show summary
Introduction
The show begins with an opening fanfare that includes the movement of searchlights across Cinderella Castle and the park hub, ending with two large firework bursts. Narration from Angela Bassett welcomes guests with the following words:

"Good evening. Tonight we gather in a most enchanted kingdom, one overflowing with magic.

And, once upon a time, it all began with a dream..."

An instrumental version of “When You Wish Upon a Star” plays as historical footage and images from the announcement of Walt Disney World's construction in Florida, including Walt Disney from the EPCOT film appear across the castle. A large blueprint canvas is then spread out across the castle, cycling between stylised characters, designs, and music from select attractions, including Pirates of the Caribbean, It's a Small World, Haunted Mansion and Carousel of Progress. Roy O. Disney's opening day speech and dedication then follows, the castle slowly transforming into its original color scheme to complement its history. As Roy's dedication ends, a large swarm of Mickey-shaped balloons begins to float from beneath the castle, ascending into the sky. Mickey Mouse, holding onto the final set of balloons, appears and lets go of them, leaping down onto the castle balcony and greeting the guests, reminding them that “they are the magic”.

”Oh, boy! This place sure is swell! Some folks like to say that it all started with a dream, but you wanna know what makes this place really special? It’s you! Each and every one of you! Any time you set foot here, you leave this place brighter than it was before, because you are the magic!”

As Mickey finishes his address, the theme song of the show "You Are the Magic" begins to play, punctuated by multiple fireworks and shells. Silhouetted scenes from Disney films appear, including: Aladdin, Peter Pan, Pinocchio, Sleeping Beauty, Onward, Tangled, Frozen/Frozen II, and Cinderella.

Songs featured: "Yo Ho (A Pirate's Life for Me)", "It's a Small World", "Grim Grinning Ghosts", and "There's a Great Big Beautiful Tomorrow"
The Second Star to the Right

Then, an instrumental version of “The Second Star to the Right” plays while Angela Bassett narrates the following words.
"Now, the magic of dreams come true is calling out to you, inspiring each of you to wish upon a star, follow your hearts, and discover a world full of wonder. 
Like those who have answered the call, if you allow your dream to be your guide, you may be surprised by what you discover... so long as you simply believe."
Almost There and Just Around the Riverbend
Stylised scenes of characters from Brave, Hercules, Coco, Aladdin, Tangled, and Onward appear, projected onto the castle in various ways.
We Know The Way
Scenes featuring characters from Raya and the Last Dragon and Zootopia are projected onto the castle, accompanied by a spectacular sparkle of fireworks, some resembling Maui’s fishhook and the spiral motif seen on the Heart of Te Fiti. The song ends as Judy Hopps walks out of a train and into the foreground, before the projections disappear with a sparkle.
Epiphany
Joe Gardner, seen in “the zone” plays a tune on his piano before an orchestra accompaniment kicks in. As the score progresses, the projections slowly extend onto the buildings of Main Street, U.S.A. with colorful fireworks complementing it. Scenes featuring many characters from a plethora of Disney films appear and disappear intermittently, some designed in the style of former Disney artist Mary Blair, including: Alice in Wonderland, Ratatouille, Lilo & Stitch, Finding Nemo/Finding Dory, Luca, Monsters University, Cars, Wreck-It Ralph/Ralph Breaks the Internet, Sleeping Beauty, Lady and the Tramp, The Lion King, Tarzan, Dumbo, Hercules, Big Hero 6, Treasure Planet, WALL-E, and Soul. Unique varieties of fireworks accompany these sections, including cube-shaped and smiley-face ones. The section ends with WALL-E and Eve soaring into the night sky, represented by two large white shells as they leave the projection radius.

Songs featured: "Be Our Guest", "Under the Sea", "You've Got a Friend in Me", "The Silly Song", "I've Got No Strings", "A Whole New World", and "You Can Fly".
Into the Unknown
As a rock variation of Into the Unknown plays, many scenes from Disney films showcasing characters in perilous situations are projected onto the castle, appearing inside various “portals”. The song ends as Elsa appears, shooting blasts of ice off in different directions around the castle. 
Films featured include Zootopia, Aladdin, Brave, Inside Out, Coco, The Little Mermaid, Beauty and the Beast, Alice in Wonderland, Onward, and Frozen II.
Night on Bald Mountain
As the previous projection ends, shattering into fragments of ice, a lightning bolt strikes as a combined rock and instrumental version of Night on Bald Mountain from Fantasia plays, leading into a segment highlighting many Disney characters fighting their respective villains and their associates. 
Many scenes appear from the following films, such as: Frozen II, Beauty and the Beast, Inside Out, Coco, Tangled, Sleeping Beauty, Hercules, Onward, Mulan, Cinderella, Raya and the Last Dragon, and Moana.
I Am Moana 
The chaos of the previous scene slowly fades away, leaving a period of silence for a moment before a poignant, gentle reprise of I Am Moana plays featuring, eventually crescendoing into a triumphant melody as joyful scenes of Disney characters achieving their goals appear, with a triumphant finale of fireworks at the end.
Includes scenes from: Onward, Coco, Tangled, Cinderella, Mulan, Hercules, and The Princess and the Frog.
Finale
The narrator returns to intone that the true magic the audience has been searching for has been with them all the while. She adds that the Magic Kingdom will continue to serve as “a beacon to those with a wish in their heart”, reminding all who enter that “anything is possible, for you are the magic.” A pixie then begins to fly from the center of the castle and up to the tallest tower. It’s revealed to be Tinker Bell, sprinkling her pixie dust over the castle, the hub, and on Main Street, transforming them into gold. The reprise of "You Are the Magic" plays, crescendoing in a beautiful array of fireworks and lights. During the finale, Mickey Mouse walks out onto the castle balcony once more, amazed at the display, before joyfully proclaiming the following:
"You Are the Magic!"

Voice cast
Angela Bassett – Narrator
Philip Lawrence – Performer ("You Are the Magic" theme song)
Kayla Alvarez – Performer ("You Are the Magic" theme song)
Bret Iwan – Mickey Mouse (2022 revision)
Walt Disney – himself (archival recording; 2022 revision)
Roy O. Disney – himself (archival recording; 2022 revision)
James W. Rouse – himself (archival recording; 2022 revision)

Critical reception

The original version of the show received mixed to negative reviews; some praised it for its technological advancements while others criticized it for not being focused on the attractions past and present of Walt Disney World, Disney movies, or the 50th anniversary of Walt Disney World, when it debuted. It was also noted for not having much of a "story element."

The general consensus was that the original version of the show was not an improvement over Happily Ever After, with some reviewers calling the original Disney Enchantment a "bootleg" version and opining that it "fails as a successor."

After Disney Enchantment was revamped to include nostalgic elements of Walt Disney World’s history, the updated show received mostly positive reviews from visitors, as while the new additions to the show truly celebrate Walt Disney's vision and 50 years of the Walt Disney World Resort, some argue that the changes could have been implemented sooner.

See also 
 Wondrous Journeys
 Disney's Celebrate America
 Disneyland Forever
 Disney Illuminations

References

External links 
 Official Site

Walt Disney Parks and Resorts fireworks
Magic Kingdom
2021 establishments in Florida
2023 disestablishments in Florida